Bower Heath is a hamlet in Hertfordshire, England. It is in the civil parish of Harpenden

Hamlets in Hertfordshire
City of St Albans